Franz Klebusch (22 January 1887 – 25 May 1951) was a German stage and film actor. Klebusch appeared in 27 films during his career including a small role in the anti-Semitic film Jud Süß (1940).

Selected filmography
 A Murderous Girl (1929)
 The Third Confession (1929)
 Trenck (1932)
 Little Girl, Great Fortune (1933)
 Between Two Hearts (1934)
 The Sporck Battalion (1934)
 The Private Life of Louis XIV (1935)
 Black Roses (1935)
 Across the Desert (1936)
 Love's Awakening (1936)

References

Bibliography 
 Picart, Caroline Joan.  The Holocaust Film Sourcebook: Documentary and propaganda. Praeger, 2004 .

External links 
 

1887 births
1951 deaths
German male film actors
German male silent film actors
20th-century German male actors
German male stage actors
Actors from Mannheim